Public Castration Is a Good Idea is the first live album by American experimental rock band Swans. It was originally released as a semi-officially approved bootleg through Some Bizzare Records in 1986, consisting of performances recorded from shows in London and Nottingham on the tour for the albums Greed and Holy Money. The performances were recorded from London's ICA, The Garage in Nottingham and London's ULU.

The compact disc edition, released by Thirsty Ear on July 6, 1999, was mastered from a vinyl source. 
An accompanying videocassette (betamax and VHS editions) of the same tour (both containing set lists that are identical to the LP) was released called A Long Slow Screw.

Track listing

Personnel
Michael Gira
Norman Westberg
Algis Kizys
Jarboe
Ronaldo Gonzalez
Ted Parsons
Jack Balchin - sound technician

References

1986 live albums
Swans (band) live albums
Albums produced by Michael Gira